The 2002 election for Mayor of Newark took place in Newark, the most populous city in the state of New Jersey, on May 14, 2002. Elections for all seats on the nine member Municipal Council of Newark were held the same day. A runoff election, if necessary, would have taken place. Elections in the city are non-partisan and candidates are not listed by political party. Incumbent Mayor and State Senator Sharpe James avoided a runoff and was re-elected to his fifth term in office. He was first Newark mayor to be elected five times.

This campaign was the subject of the 2005 documentary Street Fight. Cory Booker, who had become a municipal council member in 1998, was elected Mayor of Newark in 2006 and re-elected in 2010. After having won the October 16 special election for U.S. senator he resigned as mayor and was sworn in on October 31, 2013 as the junior U.S. senator from New Jersey. He was an unsuccessful candidate in the 2020 Democratic Party presidential primaries, ending his campaign three weeks before the first nominating contest, the 2020 Iowa Democratic caucuses.

Candidates
The deadline for candidates to file for election was April 14.

Declared
 Cory Booker, Newark City Councilman
 Sharpe James, State Senator and incumbent Mayor of Newark
 Dwayne Smith, businessman and former law enforcement officer

Though all elections are non-partisan, all candidates are registered Democrats and Newark is a heavily Democratic city.

Campaign
The election was noted for its acrimony and attacks by both candidates. James called Booker "a Republican who took money from the KKK [and] Taliban ... [who's] collaborating with the Jews to take over Newark". Booker focused on James's reputation for corruption.

One focus of the campaign was race. Booker, who is of mixed African and European ancestry and was raised in the wealthy suburbs, was accused of insufficient connection to the city's impoverished, majority-black voters.

Endorsements

Results
If no candidate received 50% of the vote, the race would have continued to a run-off between the top two candidates from the first round.

James received 52.95 percent of the total vote, securing re-election.

References

External links 

Cory Booker
2002
2002 United States mayoral elections
Newark